The crescent-caped lophorina or Vogelkop superb bird-of-paradise (Lophorina niedda), sometimes noted as the curl-caped bird-of-paradise, is a species of the Paradisaeidae (bird-of-paradise) family. It is endemic to the Bird's Head Peninsula in New Guinea (Vogelkop in Dutch). First described in 1930 by Ernst Mayr, it had been treated as a subspecies of the superb bird-of-paradise but was elevated to the status of a full species in 2017, and reinforced in 2018 based on its striking black plumage (its feathers absorb 99.95 percent of light) and behavioral differences, especially visible in the courting male.

Etymology 
The crescent-caped lophorina's scientific name consists of the words lophorina, meaning "tuft/crest-nose", referring to the upward-standing tufts of feathers behind each nostril, and niedda which refers to the native onomatopoeic name for a bird-of-paradise. The subspecies, L. n. inopinata specific name means unexpected or unlooked for.

Taxonomy and systematics 
Historical sources generally recorded the crescent-caped lophorina as being a subspecies of the superb bird-of-paradise (Lophorina superba niedda); however, in 2017, the crescent-caped lophorina was formally treated as a separate species. There are two known subspecies: L. n. niedda, found on the Wadammen Peninsula; and L. n. inopinata, found on the Doberai Peninsula. There are also several differences in courtship behavior, as well as their geographic isolation from the rest of the population.
This classification is disputed, however; the subspecies inopinata comprises the taxon formerly known as L. superba superba, but given a new name, while other taxonomists argue that regardless of the evidence, names should not be reassigned from one recognized taxon to another after over 200 years of consistent application.

Distribution and habitat
The crescent-caped lophorina is found in the mountains of Bird's Neck Peninsula, in Western New Guinea, Indonesia. It is typically found at heights of 1200–2000 m.

References

External links

Birds described in 1930
Taxa named by Ernst Mayr
Birds of Indonesia
Birds of New Guinea
Lophorina